Arif Asadov (born 18 August 1970) is an Azerbaijani professional football coach and a former player. He is an assistant coach with the Azerbaijan national football team.

Club career
He made his professional debut in the Soviet Top League in 1988 for Neftchi Baku .

Honours
 Azerbaijan Premier League champion: 1992, 1996.
 Azerbaijan Premier League runner-up: 1997, 1998.
 Azerbaijan Premier League bronze: 1993, 1995.

Statistics
Information correct as of 7 March 2014. Only competitive matches are counted.

Notes:

References

1970 births
Footballers from Baku
Living people
Soviet footballers
Azerbaijani footballers
Azerbaijan international footballers
Neftçi PFK managers
FC Spartak Vladikavkaz players
FC Tyumen players
FC Anzhi Makhachkala players
Azerbaijani expatriate footballers
Soviet Top League players
Russian Premier League players
Azerbaijan Premier League players
Soviet Azerbaijani people
Azerbaijani football managers
Association football defenders
Neftçi PFK players